Greater Atlanta Christian School is a private Christian school located in Norcross, Georgia, United States.

Notable alumni

 Micah Abernathy, NFL Free Safety for the Green Bay Packers
 Sherill Baker, former WNBA player
 Cindy Brogdon, 1976 Olympic women's basketball team, first female in Georgia to receive an athletic scholarship
 Malcolm Brogdon, NBA player for the Indiana Pacers, NBA Rookie of the year 2017
 Austin Crute, actor
 Chuck Efstration, Georgia State Representative
 Caleb King, former NFL running back
 Andrew Knowlton, journalist 
 Danielle Marcano (born 1997), professional soccer forward, who plays in the Turkish Women's Football Super League for Fenerbahçe S.K.
 Davis Mills, NFL quarterback for the Houston Texans
 Kalif Raymond, NFL wide receiver for the Detroit Lions
 Darius Slayton, NFL wide receiver for the New York Giants
 Drew Steckenrider, MLB pitcher for the Seattle Mariners
 Kayla Tausche, broadcast journalist for CNBC
 Isaiah Wilkins, former Basketball Bundesliga player for the ratiopharm Ulm

References

External links

 Greater Atlanta Christian School

Christian schools in Georgia (U.S. state)
Educational institutions established in 1967
Private high schools in Georgia (U.S. state)
Schools in Gwinnett County, Georgia
Private middle schools in Georgia (U.S. state)
Private elementary schools in Georgia (U.S. state)
Preparatory schools in Georgia (U.S. state)
1967 establishments in Georgia (U.S. state)